The 1895 Northwestern Law football team was an American football team that represented the Northwestern University School of Law in the 1895 college football season.

Schedule

References

Northwestern Law
Northwestern Law Football